Brampton West is a federal electoral district in Ontario, Canada, that has been represented in the House of Commons of Canada since 2004. Its population was 170,422 in 2006- making it the most populous riding in Canada.

The district includes the western part of the city of Brampton excluding the neighbourhood of Madoc.

The electoral district was created in 2003: 72.8% of the population of the riding came from Brampton West—Mississauga, and 27.2% from Brampton Centre. As a result of the 2012 electoral redistribution, this riding lost just over half of its territory, mostly to Brampton South, with portions going to Brampton North.

The Toronto Real Estate Board labels this section as "W24" in their studies.

People of Jamaican ethnic origin make up 13.0% of the riding's population, the highest such percentage in Canada.

Demographics 
According to the 2021 Canada Census

Ethnic groups: 56.0% South Asian, 16.1% Black, 12.9% White, 3.4% Filipino, 1.6% Latin American, 1.3% Southeast Asian, 1.0% Chinese

Languages: 41.8% English, 20.3% Punjabi, 4.4% Urdu, 3.8% Hindi, 3.4% Gujarati, 2.4% Tamil, 1.6% Tagalog, 1.5% Portuguese, 1.1% Spanish

Religions: 34.2% Christian (16.3% Catholic, 3.2% Pentecostal, 14.7% Other), 24.4% Sikh, 20.4% Hindu, 10.6% Muslim, 1.1% Buddhist, 8.8% None

Median income: $37,600 (2020)

Average income: $46,640 (2020)

Member of Parliament

The riding has elected the following Member of Parliament:

Election results

2021

2019

2015

2011

2008

The 2008 federal election in this riding featured candidates from the four main national parties. The Greens' Patti Chemelyk is an administrator in the health care industry; Jagtar Shergill of the NDP was a registered insurance broker who had run for the party in 2006 and for Brampton City Council the same year; Conservative Kyle Seeback is a commercial litigation lawyer and former national-level swimmer; and winner Andrew Kania, a Liberal, practiced family law.

Seeback was nominated by the Conservatives in April 2008.

Liberal incumbent Colleen Beaumier announced her retirement from the politics. This left the riding without an incumbent, and the Brampton West Federal Liberal Riding Association without a candidate to run. The hopefuls for the Liberal nomination were Dipika Damerla, Raj Jhajj, and Andrew Kania. Jhajj was the riding president, but stepped down from the position, to be considered. Kania had previously sought the party's nomination in Brampton—Springdale, but then-Prime Minister Paul Martin placed Dr. Ruby Dhalla as the candidate. On September 12, the riding association gathered at the Marriott Courtyard Convention Centre, where Kania's selection was announced.

Kania won by a small margin, with the election being one of the last to be called, with Kania not taking the lead until midnight; the election was so tight, The Toronto Star declared Seeback the winner in a published article, latter retracted. The Conservatives won nationally, with the Liberals losing around 20 seats. Kania commented, "I am very thankful to the people of Brampton West for trusting me to represent them in circumstances where the Liberal Party lost about 20 seats. Nobody will work harder, or care more. They will not be disappointed and much good will come from this win." Seeback commented that, "I said it was going to be under a thousand votes; I didn't expect it to be this close, though."

On October 23, 2008, Elections Canada announced that a judicial recount had been granted in Brampton West, under an Ontario Superior Court judge. It is the fifth recount ordered, post-election.

2006

2004

See also
 List of Canadian federal electoral districts
 Past Canadian electoral districts

References

 Riding history from the Library of Parliament
2011 Results from Elections Canada
 Campaign expense data from Elections Canada

Notes

Ontario federal electoral districts
Politics of Brampton
2003 establishments in Ontario